The 2020 Overwatch League All-Star Games refer to two Overwatch League (OWL) All-Star Games – one from each region of the 2020 season. All-Stars Asia took place on September 26, 2020, while All-Stars North America took place on October 3, 2020. Each game was the culmination of the each region's 2020 All-Star Weekend.

Asia Region

All-Star Game 
The 2020 All-Stars Asia Game followed a different format than that of previous years. While the first map followed the standard six-versus-six format, each team selected their opponents team composition for the second map. The third map was played using the "Tiny Overwatch" workshop mod, where each player's model began the match as a smaller version of itself than normal, but character size, damage, and healing values scaled upwards as a player put out more damage and healing.

Roster selection 
The rosters for the All-Star Asia Game were selected through a voting process, although Blizzard adjusted picks to ensure that at least one player from each team was represented in the All-Star Weekend. Eighteen players in the Asia region were chosen by the fans, with voting beginning on August 23 and ending on August 28. Fans were allowed to vote for a maximum of four DPS, four tank, and four support players from each region. Twenty-four players were selected for All-Stars Asia, which included players from teams in the North America region that had gone home to Asia.

Source:

Game summary

All-Star Weekend 
In addition to the All-Star Games, the All-Stars Asia Weekend featured the Talent Takedown, Widowmaker 1v1 Tournament, Winston Skills Challenge, Genji Skills Challenge, Ana Skills Challenge, and Who is Meta? competition.

Talent Takedown 
The Talent Takedown was a match played by the casters and analysts of the Overwatch League. Two teams, one from China and one South Korea, of casters and analysts faced each other in the Talent Takedown. The match consisted of two maps, where at the beginning of each map, one of the teams selected a buff from various options.

Widowmaker 1v1 
The Widowmaker 1v1 tournament was a single-elimination tournament played by the eight top hitscan players from Asia. Players were only able to use the character Widowmaker, automatic firing was disabled, and only headshots applied damage to another player. The winner of each round was determined by which player got five eliminations, except for the finals, where the winner was determined by which player got nine eliminations.

Winston Skills Challenge 
The Winston Skills Challenge was a single-elimination tournament played by the top four Winston players from the region. Each map was played on Ilios, and the winner of each round was determined by which player was able to push a neutral Wrecking Ball into the well located at the center of the map two times, aside from the final match, which a player needed to complete this task three times. Each player had unlimited Primal Rage, Winston's ultimate ability.

Genji Skills Challenge 
The Genji Skills Challenge was a single-elimination tournament played by the top four Genji players from the region. Each map was played on Castillo, and the winner of each round was determined by which player got three eliminations, except for the final, where the winner was determined by which player got five eliminations.

Ana Skills Challenge 
The Ana Skills Challenge was series of deathmatches played by the top nine Ana players from the region. The first map was played on Black Forest, while the second, and final, map was played on Necropolis. A round ended when a player reached 20 eliminations or the five-minute time limit had been reached. The top four players from the first round advanced to the final round.

Who is Meta? 
The Who is Meta? match was a deathmatch played by the eight players in the region with the most "Fleta Deadlifts" in the season (a player achieves a Fleta Deadlift if they claim over half of their team's final blows in a match). Each player began the match as the character McCree. After a player obtained a kill, they were automatically changed to another character. The first player to get kills on all 22 characters won the match.

North America Region

All-Star Game 
The North America All-Star Game followed the same ruleset as its Asia counterpart. While the first map followed the standard six-versus-six format, each team selected their opponents team composition for the second map. The third map was played using the "Tiny Overwatch" workshop mod, where each player's model began the match as a smaller version of itself than normal, but character size, damage, and healing values scaled upwards as a player put out more damage and healing.

Roster selection 
The roster for the All-Star North America Game were selected through a voting process, although Blizzard adjusted picks to ensure that at least one player from each team was represented in the All-Star Weekend. Eighteen players in the North America region were chosen by the fans, with voting beginning on August 23 and ending on August 28. Fans were allowed to vote for a maximum of four DPS, four tank, and four support players from each region. Twenty players were selected for All-Stars North America. The players were then drafted into two teams by the coaches of the All-Star Game.

Game summary

All-Star Weekend 
In addition to the All-Star Games, each region's All-Star Weekend featured a Talent Takedown and a Widowmaker 1v1 Tournament.

Talent Takedown 
The Talent Takedown was a match played by the casters and analysts of the Overwatch League. Two teams, both from North America, of casters and analysts faced each other in the Talent Takedown. The match consisted of three maps. On the first map, each team must have had Genji and Mercy on their team, on the second map, they must have used the GOATS composition, and on the third map, each team must have had Widowmaker and Tracer on their team.

Widowmaker 1v1 
The Widowmaker 1v1 tournament was a single-elimination tournament played by the eight top hitscan players from the region. Players were only able to use the character Widowmaker, automatic firing was disabled, and only headshots applied damage to another player. The winner of each round was determined by which player got five eliminations, except for the final match, where the winner was determined by which player got nine eliminations.

Prize Pool 

Broadcasting
The entire All-Star Weekend was broadcast live on YouTube and Overwatch League website.

References 

All-Star